Rowland Winter (born 17 February 1985) is a British rugby union Director of Rugby and coach.

Coaching career

Early roles
Winter began his coaching career at Northampton Saints, in a number of roles within the Junior Academy and Community Development. During his early 20s, Winter enjoyed successful league and cup wins as Head coach at both Northampton BBOB RFC and Bedford Athletic. He had successful coaching experience in the England U-20s Counties structure.

Cambridge RFC
From February 2013 Winter was appointed Director of Rugby at Cambridge RFC. He restructured all playing aspects of the club over a successful three year period, and led them to win the English National League 2 in 2015-16.

Eastern Counties
Winter led the senior Eastern Counties team to a County Cup Final at Twickenham in 2015.

Coventry RFC
In May 2016 he was appointed Director of Rugby at Coventry RFC, leading them to win the English National League 1 in the 2017-18 season.
In May 2018 he signed a contract extension to 2022.

In 2018-19 Winter led Coventry to an 8th place finish, and cup quarter final in their first season back in the Greene King IPA Championship. To date, this is the most successful and highest place finish from any promoted side in the history of the competition.

In 2019-20 Coventry were 4th, when coronavirus halted the Championship.

In January 2022, following a home defeat by Cornish Pirates, Winters whereabouts became a mystery. The lack of communication and transparency from the club, or Winter, have left supporters bemused and allowed wide- ranging rumours to fill the void.

Methods
At both Cambridge and Coventry Winter made significant changes in both the coaching team and playing squad soon after being appointed.

References 

Living people
Rugby union coaches
1985 births